The Ministry of Foreign Affairs is the Andorran government ministry which oversees the foreign relations of Andorra.

Ministers of Foreign Affairs of Andorra:
 Antoni Armengol (1993–1994)
 Marc Vila Amigó (1994)
 Manuel Mas Ribó (1994–1997)
 Albert Pintat (1997–2001)
 Juli Minoves Triquell (12 April 2001 – 7 May 2007)
 Meritxell Mateu i Pi (2007–2009)
 Xavier Espot Miró (8 June 2009 – 2011)
 Gilbert Saboya Sunyé (16 May 2011 – 17 July 2017)
 Maria Ubach i Font (since 17 July 2017)

Structure 
 Department of Bilateral and Consular Affairs
 Department of Multilateral Affairs and Cooperation

See also 
 Foreign relations of Andorra

External links 

 Ministry of Foreign Affairs

External Affairs
Foreign relations of Andorra
Andorra